Tomasz Wojciech Misiak (born 7 July 1973 in Wrocław) is a Polish businessman and politician. He co-founded Work Service, the biggest Polish employment agency and served as a senator, representing Civic Platform.

Biography
He is a graduate of the University of Economics in Wroclaw. He also took part in programmes of "Management" and "Global Leadership Seminar" at Canadian Institute of Management and Georgetown University. In 2012 he graduated AMP programme at IESE Business School in Barcelona and GLOBAL CEO program organized by IESE, CEBIS, WHARTON Business Schools.

After his engagement in students organizations he started activities in local government in Wroclaw City Council, where he was a chairman of the Economic Initiatives Committee.

In 1997–2007 Misiak was vice-president and founder of Work Service S.A., the biggest Polish personal services company.

In 2005–2011, as a senator of Republic of Poland, he was head of Economy Committee and also engaged in activities of European Union Committee. Since 2011 he has been an owner and manager of HMS Investment Fund LTD. In 2012 he has been elected as a vice president of the biggest Polish employers organisation Pracodawcy RP. In 2013 he was also appointed as a member of BIAC and member of New Leader of Tomorrow in Crans Montana Forum organisation.

Misiak is key shareholder and has been the president of Supervisory Board in Work Service S.A. He is also member of Exact System Sp. z o.o.,  MM Conferences, IT Kontrakt, and Hawe S.A. boards. He received multiple business awards i.a.: Teraz Polska, Enterpreuer of the Year Ernst&Young, Lider Przedsiębiorczości, Lider Rynku, Bloomberg Manager of the Year 2015.

On October 8, 2019 Extraordinary General Meeting of the Shareholders dismissed Misiak from Supervisory Board of Work Service S.A.

References

1973 births
Living people
Politicians from Wrocław
Members of the Senate of Poland 2005–2007
Businesspeople from Wrocław